The 2017 Wisconsin Spring Election was held in the U.S. state of Wisconsin on April 4, 2017.  The top of the ballot was the election for state Superintendent of Public Instruction.  There was also an uncontested election for Wisconsin Supreme Court, three uncontested elections for Wisconsin Court of Appeals, and several other nonpartisan local and judicial elections.  There were also a number of local referendums for school funding.  The 2017 Wisconsin Spring Primary was held February 21, 2017.

In the election for Superintendent of Public Instruction, incumbent Tony Evers won a third term.  He would not complete the term, however, as he was elected Governor of Wisconsin the following year.

State elections

Public Instruction
Incumbent Superintendent of Public Instruction Tony Evers easily defeated challenger Lowell E. Holtz, taking nearly 70% of the vote.  Evers' performance in this statewide election was later useful as he made his case in a crowded Democratic Primary field for Governor of Wisconsin in 2018.

| colspan="6" style="text-align:center;background-color: #e9e9e9;"| Primary Election, February 21, 2017

| colspan="6" style="text-align:center;background-color: #e9e9e9;"| General Election, April 4, 2017

Judicial

State Supreme Court 

A regularly-scheduled Wisconsin Supreme Court election was held this year. Incumbent Annette Ziegler was unopposed seeking her second ten-year term.

State Court of Appeals 
Three seats on the Wisconsin Court of Appeals were up for election in 2017.  All three were uncontested.
 In District I, Judge William W. Brash III, appointed by Governor Scott Walker in 2015, was unopposed seeking election to his first full term.
 In District II, Judge Brian Hagedorn, also appointed by Governor Scott Walker in 2015, was unopposed seeking election to his first full term.
 In District IV, Rock County Circuit Court Judge Michael R. Fitzpatrick was unopposed in the election to succeed retiring judge Paul B. Higginbotham.

State Circuit Courts 
Forty eight of the state's 249 circuit court seats were up for election in 2017.  Eleven of those seats were contested.  No incumbent judge was defeated in the general election, but Trempealeau County judge Charles V. Feltes was defeated in the February primary.  Feltes had been appointed by Governor Scott Walker the previous July.

Local elections

Madison
Dane County Executive Joe Parisi won re-election without opposition.

Racine
In Racine's special mayoral election, held in October, State Assemblymember Cory Mason was elected to fill the remainder of Mayor John Dickert's unexpired term.  Mason topped a six-person primary and went on to defeat Alderman Sandy Weidner in the special election.

School referendums
There were 65 local education-funding referendums on the ballot in the 2017 election.  40 of those referendums passed, awarding the school districts approximately $700 million in additional funding.

References 

 
Wisconsin